Amin Amer (born 1 August 1966) is an Egyptian swimmer. He competed in two events at the 1988 Summer Olympics.

References

External links

1966 births
Living people
Egyptian male swimmers
Olympic swimmers of Egypt
Swimmers at the 1988 Summer Olympics
Place of birth missing (living people)